Karin Illgen (born 7 April 1941 in Greifswald, Mecklenburg-Vorpommern) is a female discus thrower, who competed for East Germany during her career. She represented East Germany at the 1968 Summer Olympics in Mexico City, finishing in tenth place in the overall-rankings. Illgen is best known for winning the gold medal in the women's discus event at the 1970 Summer Universiade in Torino. She also participated at the 1971 European Championships in Athletics, but was eliminated in the qualification round.

She continues to throw in masters athletics.

References

1941 births
Living people
East German female discus throwers
German female discus throwers
Athletes (track and field) at the 1968 Summer Olympics
Olympic athletes of East Germany
Universiade medalists in athletics (track and field)
People from Greifswald
Universiade gold medalists for East Germany
Medalists at the 1970 Summer Universiade
Sportspeople from Mecklenburg-Western Pomerania